Since Peter Waldo's Franco-Provençal translation of the New Testament in the late 1170s, and Guyart des Moulins' Bible Historiale manuscripts of the Late Middle Ages, there have been innumerable vernacular translations of the scriptures on the European continent, greatly aided and catalysed by the development of the printing press, first invented by Johannes Gutenberg in the late 1430s.

Albanian

Arpitan

Avar

Bashkir

Basque

Belarusian

Breton

Bulgarian

Catalan

Chuvash

Cornish

Corsican
The translation of the Bible into Corsican is the work of Christian Dubois (2005).

Croatian

Czech

Danish

Dutch

English

Estonian

Faroese

Finnish

French

German

Greek

Hungarian

Icelandic

Irish

Italian

Kalmyk

Kashubian

Komi

Kumyk

Latvian

Lithuanian

Macedonian

Maltese

Manx

Norwegian

Norman

Occitan

Polish

Portuguese

Romani

Romanian

Romansh

Russian

Scots

Scottish Gaelic

Serbian

Slovak

Slovene

Sorbian

Spanish

Swedish

Tatar

Turkish

Ukrainian

Welsh

Yiddish

References

Christianity in Europe
Languages of Europe
Europe